The 1962 Roller Hockey World Cup was the fifteenth roller hockey world cup, organized by the Fédération Internationale de Patinage a Roulettes (now under the name of Fédération Internationale de Roller Sports). It was contested by 10 national teams (6 from Europe and 4 from South America). All the games were played in the city of Santiago, in Chile, the chosen city to host the World Cup.

Results

Standings

See also
 FIRS Roller Hockey World Cup

External links
 1962 World Cup in rink-hockey.net historical database

Roller Hockey World Cup
1962 in Chilean sport
1962 in roller hockey
International roller hockey competitions hosted by Chile